Bicolorana bicolor 
 is a species of bush cricket in the subfamily Tettigoniinae and tribe Platycleidini: found in mainland Western Europe. Individuals are normally brachypterous, but long-winged forms may be encountered.

Databases currently (June 2018) disagree on the preferred placement of this and the synonym Metrioptera bicolor. It was originally described by RA Philippi in 1830 as "Locusta bicolor".

Subspecies
The Catalogue of Life lists:
 B. bicolor angarica
 B. bicolor bicolor

Gallery

References

External links

Orthoptera of Europe
Tettigoniidae
Insects described in 1830